Robert Lynd Erskine Lowry, Baron Lowry, PC, PC (NI) (30 January 1919 – 15 January 1999), was a Lord Chief Justice of Northern Ireland and a Lord of Appeal in Ordinary. Knighted in 1971, he was created a life peer as Baron Lowry, of Crossgar in the County of Down, on 18 July 1979, in the early months of the Thatcher government.

Early life
His father was former Ulster Unionist Member of Parliament and Attorney General for Northern Ireland William Lowry. His mother was a niece of Sinn Féin activist, Robert Wilson Lynd. He attended the Royal Belfast Academical Institution and Jesus College, Cambridge, where he read Classics, achieving a double first.

Military
During the Second World War, he fought with the Royal Inniskilling Fusiliers in Tunisia, followed by the Royal Irish Fusiliers before becoming a Major in 1945.

He has since held the title of Honorary Colonel for
38th Irish Infantry Brigade - 5th Battalion and 7th Battalion
Royal Irish Rangers- 5th (Volunteer) Battalion

Law
He was admitted to the Bar of Northern Ireland in 1947. He was a High Court Judge in Northern Ireland from 1964 until he became Lord Chief Justice of Northern Ireland in 1971, when he was also made a Northern Ireland Privy Counsellor.

In 1973, after the Northern Ireland (Emergency Provisions) Act came into effect and "provided that a confession was admissible in evidence in a criminal trial unless it had been obtained by violence, torture, or inhuman treatment", Lowry held that the trial judge still retained a discretion under common law to exclude the confession if its admission would not be in the interests of justice.

Lowry did not exclude self-incriminating evidence alone as insufficient to convict upon, and in R v. Gorman he found that the Northern Ireland Act 1972 s. 1, by retrospectively validating the conferment of powers of arrest under the regulations, rendered lawful the otherwise unlawful arrest and subsequent detention of Gorman. Lowry was unable to implement Article 7 of the European Convention on Human Rights (ECHR), as it was not incorporated into UK law until the Human Rights Act 1998.

In 1975, Lowry was appointed by Merlyn Rees to chair the Northern Ireland Constitutional Convention, an unsuccessful attempt to replace the collapsed Sunningdale Agreement.

In 1977, John Hume challenged a regulation under the 1922 Civil Authorities (Special Powers) Act (Northern Ireland), which allowed any soldier to disperse an assembly of three or more people. Lowry held the regulation was ultra vires under Section 4 of the Government of Ireland Act 1920 which forbade the Parliament of Northern Ireland from making laws in respect to the British Army.

In 1980, Lowry partly excused the actions of two members of the Glennane gang who were serving in the Royal Ulster Constabulary (RUC) and convicted of murder and bombing by stating they acted under the "powerful motive... that more than ordinary police work was justified to rid the land of the pestilence which had been in existence". This was criticised by the Historical Enquiries Team of the Police Service of Northern Ireland as "difficult to conceive of a statement more fundamentally flawed or calculated to destroy the confidence of a large section of the community in the court's independence and probity".

Lowry presided over some of the Diplock court cases. He also presided over the supergrass trial in 1983 where Kevin McGrady, a former IRA member, gave evidence which led to the conviction of seven out of ten defendants. As a result, Lowry became an IRA target, narrowly missing death on at least three occasions. In 1982, having just survived a hail of IRA bullets, he proceeded to give a planned lecture at Queen's University, Belfast.

He was an honorary Bencher of the King's Inns, Dublin, and of the Middle Temple, and he was a Law Lord.

Personal life
Lord Lowry married twice:
Mary Martin (d. 1987), in 1948, with whom he had three daughters (Sheila, Anne and Margaret).
Barbara Calvert, Lady Lowry QC, in 1994 (daughter of Albert Parker CBE). She died in 2015.

See also
 List of Northern Ireland Members of the House of Lords

References

1919 births
1999 deaths
Alumni of Jesus College, Cambridge
British Army personnel of World War II
High Court judges of Northern Ireland
Knights Bachelor
Law lords
Lord chief justices of Northern Ireland
Members of the Judicial Committee of the Privy Council
Members of the Privy Council of Northern Ireland
Lawyers from Belfast
People educated at the Royal Belfast Academical Institution
Royal Inniskilling Fusiliers officers
Royal Irish Fusiliers officers
Members of the Privy Council of the United Kingdom
Northern Ireland King's Counsel
Life peers created by Elizabeth II